Jean Yee Hwa Yang is an Australian statistician known for her work on variance reduction for microarrays, and for inferring proteins from mass spectrometry data. Yang is a Professor in the School of Mathematics and Statistics at the University of Sydney.

Education and career
Yang studied at Killara High School between 1987 and 1990 and at Barker College between 1991 and 1992. She earned a bachelor's degree with first class honours and a University Medal from the University of Sydney in 1996, in mathematics and statistics.

After working for half a year at the Commonwealth Scientific and Industrial Research Organisation, Yang then went to the University of California, Berkeley, for graduate study, completing her Ph.D. in statistics in 2002. Her dissertation, "Statistical methods in the design and analysis of gene expression data from cDNA microarray experiment", was supervised by Terry Speed.

Yang did postdoctoral research in biostatistics and bioinformatics with Mark R. Segal at the University of California, San Francisco, where she became an assistant professor in 2003. In 2005 she returned to the University of Sydney with a faculty position.

Recognition
In 2015, Yang was the winner of the Moran Medal of the Australian Academy of Science for her "significant contributions to the development of statistical methodology for analyzing molecular data arising in contemporary biomedical research".

Selected publications

References

External links
Home page

Year of birth missing (living people)
Living people
Australian statisticians
Women statisticians
University of Sydney alumni
Academic staff of the University of Sydney